Drew Forsythe (born 23 August 1949) is an Australian actor, singer, writer, and comedian. He has appeared on film, stage, and television, as well as in satirical sketch comedy television programs.

Early life

Born in Sydney, New South Wales, Forsythe attended Atherton Primary School, far north Queensland.

Career

The title roles of the heroic Tonino and the foolish Zanetto in the Nick Enright/Terence Clarke musical, The Venetian Twins, were written for Forsythe.  He originated these dual roles for Nimrod Theatre Company in the first Sydney Theatre Company season in 1979, and subsequently in two revivals.  Other stage appearances include the Gilbert and Sullivan comic operas H.M.S. Pinafore and The Mikado for Essgee Entertainment, receiving a Melbourne Green Room Award as Ko-Ko in The Mikado in 1995.

For the film Caddie, Forsythe received the 1976 Australian Film Institute Award for Best Actor in a Supporting Role. His television appearances include The Miraculous Mellops, The Dingo Principle, and Three Men and a Baby Grand, satirical sketch television comedy programs for which he was a writer/performer with Phillip Scott and Jonathan Biggins. The 'Three Men' team started in revue at the Tilbury Hotel, and much of the thematic material from these revues has been revisited and developed in the Sydney Theatre Company's 'Wharf Revue' series.

Forsythe provided the anonymous, uncredited voice of David Tench, a computer-animated host on Network Ten's short-lived comedy talk show David Tench Tonight. He also voiced several characters on the Australian award-winning animated series I Got a Rocket.

Forsythe is credited with  singing the theme song for the ABC's long-running Sunday morning radio program, Australia All Over, hosted by Ian McNamara. For more than thirty years when over 2 million listeners spanning every corner of Australia tune in from 5.30 am on Sunday mornings to listen to 'Macca' they are greeted by Forsythe singing - "Macca on a Sunday Morning".

Personal life

Forsythe's son, Abe Forsythe, is an actor and director.

References

External links 

1949 births
Living people
Australian operatic baritones
Australian male comedians
Australian male film actors
Australian male singers
Australian male musical theatre actors
Australian male stage actors
Australian male television actors
Australian male voice actors
Musicians from Sydney
Blinky Bill
Male actors from Sydney